William Alfred Savage, VC (30 October 1912 – 28 March 1942) was a Royal Navy sailor and a recipient of the Victoria Cross, the highest award for gallantry in the face of the enemy that can be awarded to British and Commonwealth forces.

Details
Savage was 29 years old, and an able seaman in the Royal Navy during the Second World War, when the following deed took place for which he was awarded the Victoria Cross.

On 28 March 1942, in the St. Nazaire Raid, France, Savage, who was a gun-layer of a pom-pom in MGB 314, engaged enemy positions ashore, shooting with great accuracy. Although he had no gun-shield and was in a most exposed position, he continued firing with great coolness until he was finally killed at his gun.

The official citation noted "This Victoria Cross is awarded in recognition not only of the gallantry and devotion to duty of Able Seaman Savage, but also of the valour shown by many others, unnamed, in Motor Launches, Motor Gun Boats and Motor Torpedo Boats, who gallantly carried out their duty in entirely exposed positions against Enemy fire at very close range"

Legacy
Savage's Victoria Cross is displayed at the National Maritime Museum, Greenwich, England.

Savage Road located near Devonport Naval Base, Plymouth, Devonshire was named in his honour

References

External links
Smethwick Heritage
CWGC entry
Able Seaman W.A. Savage in The Art of War exhibition at the UK National Archives
Location of grave and VC medal (Cornwall)

1912 births
1942 deaths
People from Smethwick
Royal Navy sailors
Royal Navy personnel killed in World War II
Royal Navy recipients of the Victoria Cross
British World War II recipients of the Victoria Cross
Military personnel from Staffordshire